Gerry Reardon is an Irish retired football midfielder who played professionally in the North American Soccer League.

Reardon attended Adelphi University, where he was a 1979 First Team and 1980 Third Team All American soccer player.  He is a member of the Adelphi Athletic Hall of Fame.

In December 1982, the Tulsa Roughnecks selected Reardon in the second round of the North American Soccer League draft.  He was part of the Tulsa team which went on to win the 1983 Soccer Bowl.  He then played the entire 1983–1984 NASL indoor season with the Roughnecks before moving to the New York Cosmos for the 1984 season.

He currently works for the FAI.

References

External links
 NASL stats

1960 births
Living people
Adelphi Panthers men's soccer players
North American Soccer League (1968–1984) indoor players
North American Soccer League (1968–1984) players
New York Cosmos players
Republic of Ireland association footballers
Republic of Ireland expatriate association footballers
Tulsa Roughnecks (1978–1984) players
All-American men's college soccer players
Association football midfielders